Peter Moore (1929-1996) was an international speedway rider from Australia.

Speedway career 
Moore was a leading rider throughout the 1950s and 1960s, he reached the final of the Speedway World Championship on five occasions in 1956, 1958, 1963, 1959, 1960 and 1963. He gained 22 Australian caps and three British caps (when riders from Oceania were allowed to represent Britain).

He rode in the top tier of British Speedway from 1950-1974, riding for various clubs.

World Final Appearances

Individual World Championship
 1956 -  London, Wembley Stadium - 9th - 8pts
 1958 -  London, Wembley Stadium - 11th - 5pts
 1959 -  London, Wembley Stadium - 15th - 3pts
 1960 -  London, Wembley Stadium - 4th - 12pts
 1963 -  London, Wembley Stadium - 11th - 6pts

World Team Cup
 1963 -  Vienna, Stadion Wien (with Peter Craven / Dick Fisher / Barry Briggs) - 3rd - 25pts (1)
Note: Moore rode for Great Britain in the World Team Cup

References 

1929 births
1996 deaths
Australian speedway riders
Wimbledon Dons riders
Ipswich Witches riders
Long Eaton Archers riders
St Austell Gulls riders
Norwich Stars riders
Swindon Robins riders
King's Lynn Stars riders
Rayleigh Rockets riders
Hackney Hawks riders
Rye House Rockets riders